Stormy Seas is a 1923 American silent drama film directed by J.P. McGowan and starring McGowan, Helen Holmes, and Leslie Casey.

Cast

Preservation
With no prints of Stormy Seas located in any film archives, it is a lost film.

References

Bibliography
 John J. McGowan. J.P. McGowan: Biography of a Hollywood Pioneer. McFarland, 2005.

External links

1923 films
1923 drama films
Silent American drama films
Films directed by J. P. McGowan
American silent feature films
1920s English-language films
American black-and-white films
Associated Exhibitors films
1920s American films